The Third Government of the Lao People's Democratic Republic was established on 25 February 1993.

Ministries

References

Specific

Bibliography
Books:
 

Governments of Laos
1993 establishments in Laos
1998 disestablishments in Laos